Robert Parkinson (27 April 1873 – after 1901) was an English footballer. His regular position was as a forward. He was born in Preston, Lancashire. He played for Preston Ramblers, Preston Athletic, Fleetwood Rangers, Rotherham Town, Luton Town, Blackpool, Warmley, Nottingham Forest, Newton Heath, Watford and Swindon Town.

Blackpool
Parkinson was a member of the Blackpool line-up for their first-ever match in the Football League, on 5 September 1896. He played up front alongside his namesake, Jack Parkinson. He went on to make a further seven league appearances in the 1896–97 season, scoring one goal – in a 4–2 defeat at Woolwich Arsenal on 19 December.

Parkinson's final appearance for the club occurred on 23 January, in a 3–1 home defeat by Small Heath. Shortly after this, he joined Nottingham Forest.

References
General
MUFCInfo.com profile

Specific

1873 births
Year of death missing
Footballers from Preston, Lancashire
English footballers
Association football forwards
Fleetwood Rangers F.C. players
Rotherham Town F.C. (1878) players
Luton Town F.C. players
Blackpool F.C. players
Warmley F.C. players
Nottingham Forest F.C. players
Manchester United F.C. players
Watford F.C. players
Swindon Town F.C. players
English Football League players